Downtown Airport  is a privately owned, public-use airport located in the city of Springfield in Greene County, Missouri, United States.

Facilities and aircraft 
For the 12-month period ending November 30, 2005, the airport had 5,800 aircraft operations, an average of 15 per day: 95% general aviation, 4% air taxi and 1% military. At that time there were 43 aircraft based at this airport: 86% single-engine, 7% multi-engine, 5% jet and 2% helicopter.

Accidents 
On October 6, 2010, a small plane crashed on the runway at the Downtown Airport. One person was killed, and 2 others were injured.

References

External links 

Airports in Missouri
Buildings and structures in Springfield, Missouri